William Thomas George Wentworth-Fitzwilliam, 10th Earl Fitzwilliam JP (28 May 1904 – 21 September 1979), known as Tom,  of Wentworth Woodhouse, near Rotherham, Yorkshire (the largest private residence in England) and of Milton Hall, Peterborough (the largest house in Cambridgeshire), was a British peer. He was the patron of 33 livings. When he died without issue the earldom became extinct.

Origins
He was the son and heir of George Charles Wentworth-Fitzwilliam, son of Hon. George Wentworth-Fitzwilliam, MP, 3rd son of Charles William Wentworth-Fitzwilliam, 5th Earl Fitzwilliam (1786–1857). His mother was Evelyn Lyster, daughter of Charles Stephen Lyster.

Career
He was educated at Eton College in houses run by Reginald Saumarez de Havilland and Clement James Mellish Adie. In 1923 he went up to Magdalene College, Cambridge. He was appointed Justice of the Peace (JP) for the Liberty of Peterborough.

Marriage
On 3 April 1956, he married Joyce Elizabeth Mary Langdale (25 April 1898 – 7 June 1995) of Houghton Hall, Yorkshire. She had previously been married to Henry FitzAlan-Howard, 2nd Viscount FitzAlan of Derwent (1883–1962), from whom she was divorced in 1955. She died in 1995 at her home in Peterborough.

Death
He died in 1979 at Wentworth Woodhouse. He left no issue from his marriage. He left £11,776,401 gross (£11,584,880 net), thus paying virtually no death duties.

Ancestry

References
Black Diamonds by Catherine Bailey, (the rise and fall of an English Dynasty

External links
Thomas Wentworth-Fitzwilliam, 10th Earl Fitzwilliam
Genealogy

1904 births
1979 deaths
People educated at Eton College
Alumni of Magdalene College, Cambridge
Earls in the Peerage of Great Britain
Earls Fitzwilliam
English justices of the peace